Letter Never Sent may refer to:

Arts and media
 Letter Never Sent (film), a 1959 film directed by Mikhail Kalatozov
 "Letter Never Sent", an American television Covert Affairs episode
 "A Letter Never Sent", a short story by Rachel Swirsky
 Letters Never Sent (play), a play by Pamela Ribon

Music
 "Letter Never Sent", a song by R.E.M. on the album Reckoning

 "Letter Never Sent", a song by Bodyjar on the compilation Indie 2000
 Letters Never Sent, an album by Carly Simon

See also
 Letters That Were Never Sent, a compilation album by SouthFM
 Unsent Letter (disambiguation)